= Alexandre Ganoczy =

Hungarian Catholic theologian and writer (born 1928)

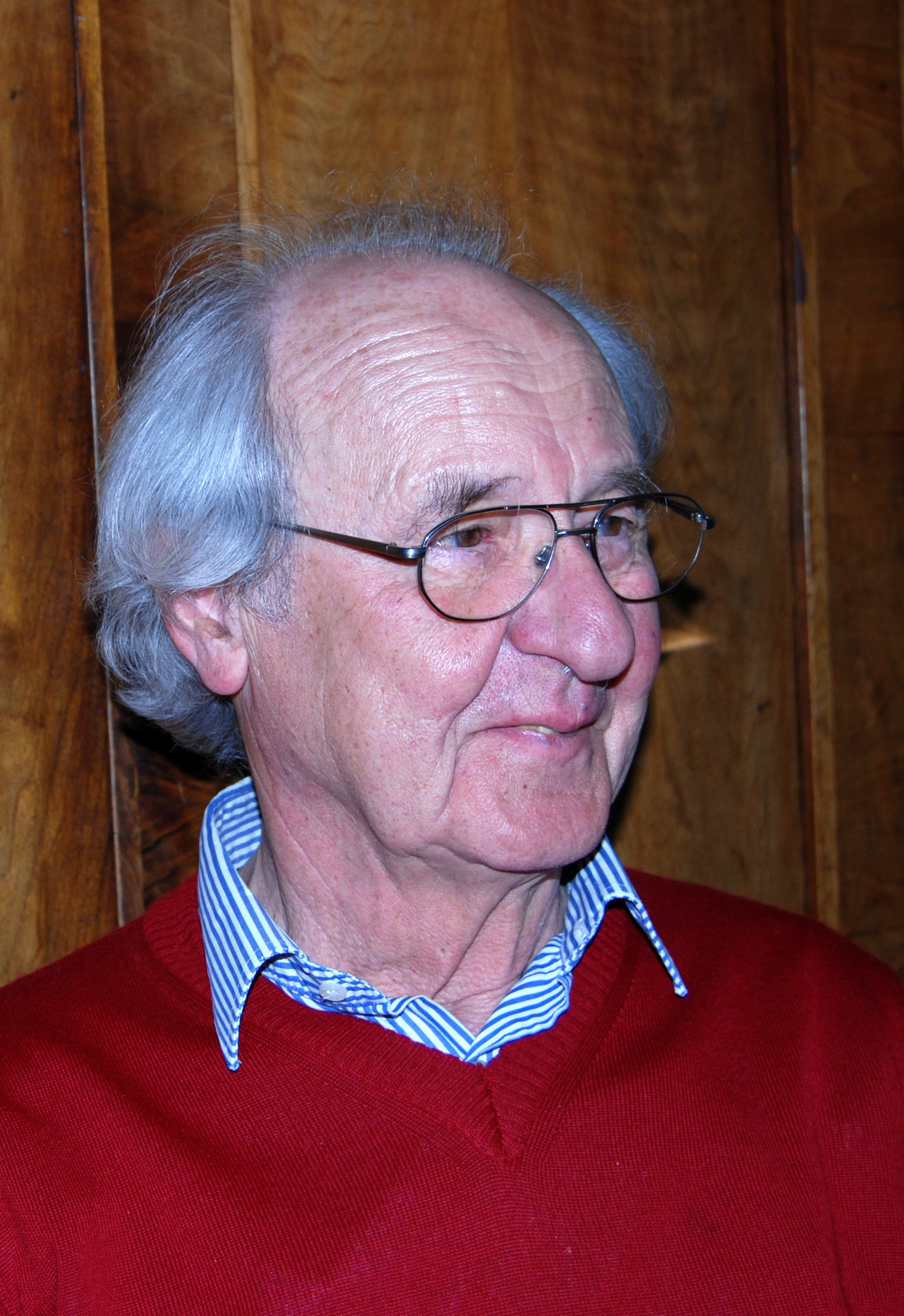

Alexandre Ganoczy (born Sándor Gánóczy; 12 December 1928 in Budapest) is a Hungarian Catholic theologian and writer.

== Selected works ==
- Le jeune Calvin : Genèse et évolution de sa vocation réformatrice, Wiesbaden : F. Steiner 1966
- Einführung in die katholische Sakramentenlehre, Wiss. Buchges., 1979
